Saint Boisil (died 661) was a monk of Melrose Abbey, an offshoot of Lindisfarne, then in the Anglo-Saxon Kingdom of Northumbria, but now in Scotland, where he must have been one of the first generation of monks.  He probably moved to the new foundation of Melrose when it was started, some time in the late 640s.

Life
Almost all that is known of Saint Boisil is learned from Bede. He derived his information from Sigfrid, a monk of Jarrow, who had previously been trained by Boisil at Melrose. St Boisil's fame is mainly due to his connection with his great pupil, Saint Cuthbert, but it is plain that the master was worthy of the disciple.

Saint Boisil was prior of this house under the holy abbot Eata, both of whom seem to have been trained in monastic discipline by Saint Aidan. It was Boisil's evident sanctity, which drew the young Saint Cuthbert to Melrose Abbey, rather than the more famous Lindisfarne, in AD 651. By chance, the prior was standing by the abbey gate when Cuthbert arrived. The latter entered the church to pray and, Bede documents that "Boisil had an intuition of the high degree of holiness to which the boy would rise”, and said just this single phrase to the monks with whom he was standing: "Behold the servant of the Lord". Abbot Eata soon gave permission for Cuthbert to enter the community, Boisil succeeded Eata as abbot in 659.

It was from the Prior that Cuthbert learned the sacred scriptures, pupil and teacher becoming great friends. Both were given to travelling amongst the villages neighbouring Melrose and preaching to the local people. The sick and ailing were brought to Boisil from far and near to be cured by his herbal remedies, and by the healing properties of the two local springs containing iron salts.

Contemporaries were deeply impressed with Boisil's supernatural intuitions. Three years beforehand, he foretold the great pestilence of 664, and that he himself should die of it, but that Eata, the abbot, should outlive it.
When in the great pestilence Cuthbert was stricken down, Boisil declared he would certainly recover. Somewhat later Boisil himself as he had foretold three years before, fell a victim to this terrible epidemic, but before the end came he predicted that Cuthbert would become a bishop and would effect great things for the Church.

After his death, Boisil appeared twice in a vision to a monk he had known, concerning the future Bishop Ecgberht of Ripon, who was instructed to concentrate on existing monasteries rather than missionary activity on the Continent. He is believed, on somewhat dubious authority, to have written certain theological works, but they have not been preserved. St Boswells in Roxburghshire commemorates his name. His relics, like those of Saint Bede, were carried off to Durham in the 11th century by the priest, Alfred Westow. In the early Calendars, his day is assigned to 23 February. The Bollandists treat of him on 9 September but his feast is generally accepted as 7 July, with a translation on 8 June.

References

External links
 

664 deaths
Northumbrian saints
7th-century Christian saints
7th-century Irish abbots
7th-century deaths from plague (disease)
Year of birth unknown